The Stephen A. Douglas High School was a district-run high school servicing the Fishtown, Port Richmond and Kensington areas of Philadelphia.

The school was closed in 2013 as part of Philadelphia's shutdown of 23 district-run schools. Displaced students were enrolled in Penn Treaty, Kensington International Business High School, Kensington Health Sciences Academy, Kensington Urban Education Academy.

Notes

Douglas, Stephen A. High School
School District of Philadelphia
Public high schools in Pennsylvania
Educational institutions disestablished in 2013
2013 disestablishments in Pennsylvania